Sør-Trøndelag University College (Norwegian: Høgskolen i Sør-Trøndelag) or HiST was a Norwegian university college located in Trondheim.  The school offered higher education within nursing, teaching, economics, food science, engineering and information technology.  The college had six campuses throughout the city and was created in 1994 as a merger between a number of independent colleges in the city. In January 2016, HiST  merged with Norwegian University of Science and Technology and  Aalesund University College and Gjøvik University College.

Faculties 
 Faculty of Health Education and Social Work, located at Leangen
 Faculty of Nursing, located at Øya
 Faculty of Informatics and e-Learning, located at Kalvskinnet
 Faculty of Teacher Education and Deaf Studies, located at Rotvoll
 Faculty of Technology, located at Kalvskinnet, Tunga and Øya
 Faculty of Business Administration, Trondheim Business School, located at Moholt

References

External links 
 Sør-Trøndelag University College

 
Universities and colleges in Norway
Education in Trondheim
Buildings and structures in Trondheim
Educational institutions established in 1994
1994 establishments in Norway